was the 13th shōgun of the Tokugawa shogunate of Japan. He held office for five years from 1853 to 1858. He was physically weak and was therefore considered by later historians to have been unfit to be shōgun. His reign marks the beginning of the Bakumatsu period.

Early years
Iesada was born in Edo Castle as Masanosuke (政之助)—the fourth son of the 12th shōgun Tokugawa Ieyoshi with his concubine, known as Honjuin. As most of Ieyoshi's children died in infancy or before coming of age, Iesada was appointed heir at a very early age, but his interaction with people was very restricted in an effort to prevent contracting any illnesses. Some historians have theorized that he may have suffered from cerebral palsy. He had suffered from smallpox in early childhood, which left his face pockmarked.
On the death of Tokugawa Ienari in 1841, concerns were raised on the fitness of Iesada as heir, with Tokugawa Yoshinobu named as a potential successor. However, this was strongly opposed by the rōjū Abe Masahiro, and Iesada remained heir.

Shōgun (1853–1858)
Iesada became shōgun on the sudden death of his father, Tokugawa Ieyoshi at the height of the Black Ships episode. Already in poor health, he took no active role in political affairs, leaving negotiations with the Americans in the hand of Abe Masahiro. The Convention of Kanagawa was signed on March 31, 1854. Abe resigned his post shortly afterwards, and was replaced as leader of the rōjū by Hotta Masayoshi.

On November 4–7, 1854, the Great Nankaidō earthquakes and tsunamis killed 80,000 people.  This was followed by the 1854 Tōkai earthquake on December 23, 1854. The earthquake struck primarily in the Tōkai region but destroyed houses as far away as in Edo. The accompanying tsunami caused damage along the entire coast from the Bōsō Peninsula in modern-day Chiba Prefecture to Tosa Province (modern-day Kōchi Prefecture). The earthquake and tsunami also struck Shimoda on Izu peninsula; and because the port had just been designated as the prospective location for a U.S. consulate, some construed the natural disasters as demonstration of the displeasure of the kami.

The 1854 Nankai earthquake followed on December 24, 1854, killing over 10,000 people from the Tōkai region down to Kyushu, and the 1855 earthquake in Edo, one of the Ansei great earthquakes, with resulting fire damage and loss of life. 	

On December 18, 1856, he married Princess Atsu, adopted daughter of Shimazu Nariakira and Konoe Tadahiro. She was known as Midaidokoro Atsuko (first-wife Atsuko).

On October 21, 1857, Iesada received the newly arrived American Consul Townsend Harris in an audience at Edo Castle.

Under Hotta Masayoshi's advice, Iesada ultimately signed the Harris Treaty of 1858 (the Treaty of Amity and Commerce between Japan and the United States), and subsequently other Unequal Treaties (including the Anglo-Japanese Friendship Treaty, and Anglo-Japanese Treaty of Amity and Commerce) which broke the sakoku (isolation) policy and opened Japan to foreign influences.

Kōmei, the reigning emperor at the time, was a major opponent of his policies. This strengthened the sonnō jōi movement.

Ii Naosuke was appointed tairō from April 23, 1858.

A widespread cholera outbreak from 1858 to 1860 is believed to have killed between 100,000 and 200,000 people in Edo alone.
Iesada died childless in 1858, possibly from the cholera outbreak. His grave is at the Tokugawa clan temple of Kan'ei-ji in Ueno. His buddhist name was Onkyoin.

Political factions within the bakufu clashed over the succession. Tokugawa Nariaki of Mito, Satsuma and others wanted to see Tokugawa Yoshinobu as his successor, while the Ōoku and shogunate officials including Ii Naosuke supported Tokugawa Iemochi, and succeeded. These quarrels ended in the Ansei Purge.

Family
Iesada was initially married to Princess Takatsukasa Atsuko (1823–1848), the daughter of kampaku Takatsukasa Masahiro in 1842. However, she died of smallpox without having given birth to an heir. His second official wife was Princess Ichijō Hideko (1825–1850), daughter of Ichijō Tadayoshi in 1849. She died of illness less than a year later. His third marriage was to Princess Atsu (1836–1883), the adopted daughter of the daimyō of Satsuma, Shimazu Nariakira.  However, none of these marriages produced any children. Before he died, he adopted his cousin as his son, Tokugawa Yoshitomi (later Tokugawa Iemochi).

 Father: Tokugawa Ieyoshi
 Mother: Honjuin (1807–1885)
 Wives: 
 Takaatsukasa Atsuko (1823–1848) later Tenryuin
 Ichijo Hideko (1825–1850) later Sunjoin
 Shimazu Atsuko or Konoe Sumiko, later Tenshō-in
 Concubine: Oshiga no Kata (d. 1857) later Hoken'in
 Adopted son: Tokugawa Iemochi

Eras of Iesada's bakufu
The years in which Iesada was shōgun are more specifically identified by more than one era name, or nengō.
 Kaei   (1848–1854)
 Ansei  (1854–1860)

Ancestry

In fiction
Tokugawa Iesada is featured in the 2008 NHK taiga drama Atsuhime, which chronicles the life of his wife Tenshō-in. He is portrayed by Masato Sakai. Iesada's portrayal in this series (unlike most other characterizations of him as an imbecile), presents a romanticized (and largely-fictionalized) image him as a reasonable, if weak-willed individual, whose interactions with his wife Atsuhime pushed him to exert effort into his work as shōgun.

Notes

References
 Jansen, Marius B. and John Whitney Hall, eds. (1989).  The Cambridge History of Japan: The Nineteenth Century. Cambridge: Cambridge University Press.  .
 Mogues, Alfred de.   Recollections of Baron Gros's Embassy to China and Japan in 1857–58. London: Richard Griffin and Company.  1860. .
 Ravina, Mark (2004).  The Last Samurai: The Life and Battles of Saigo Takamori. Hobokin, New Jersey: John Wiley & Sons. ; .
 Totman, Conrad (1967).  Politics in the Tokugawa Bakufu, 1600–1843. Cambridge: Harvard University Press. .

External links 

1824 births
1858 deaths
19th-century shōguns
Tokugawa shōguns
Tokugawa clan